The tenor guitar or four-string guitar is a slightly smaller, four-string relative of the steel-string acoustic guitar or electric guitar. The instrument was initially developed in its acoustic form by Gibson and C.F. Martin so that players of the four-string tenor banjo could double on guitar.

Construction 
Tenor guitars are four-stringed instruments normally made in the shape of a guitar, or sometimes with a lute-like pear shaped body or, more rarely, with a round banjo-like wooden body. They can be acoustic, electric or both and they can come in the form of flat top or archtop wood-bodied, metal-bodied resonator, or solid-bodied instruments.

History and development 

The earliest origins of the tenor guitar are not clear, but it seems unlikely that a true four-stringed guitar-shaped tenor guitar appeared before the late 1920s. Gibson built the tenor lute TL-4 in 1924, which had a lute-like pear-shaped body, four strings and a tenor banjo neck. It is possible that similar instruments were made by other makers such as Lyon and Healy and banjo makers, such as Bacon. In the same period, banjo makers, such as Paramount, built transitional round banjo-like wood-bodied instruments with four strings and tenor banjo necks called tenor harps. From 1927 onwards, the very first true wood-bodied acoustic tenor guitars appeared as production instruments made by both Gibson and Martin.

Almost all the major guitar makers, including Epiphone, Kay, Gretsch, Guild and National Reso-Phonic, have manufactured tenor (and plectrum) guitars as production instruments at various times. Budget tenor guitars by makers such as Harmony, Regal and Stella, were produced in large numbers in the 1950s and 1960s. National, formed by the Dopyera Brothers, also made significant numbers of resonator tenor and plectrum guitars between the 1920s and 1940s. Dobro, another company associated with the Dopyera Brothers, as well as National, also built various resonator tenor guitar models.

In 1934, Gibson introduced an acoustic archtop tenor guitar, the TG-50, based on the acoustic archtop six-string model, the L-50, with its production run lasting until 1958. In 1936 Gibson introduced the world's first commercially successful electric Spanish-style guitar, the ES-150. In early 1937 Gibson also began shipping two other versions of the ES-150: a tenor guitar (the EST-150, with four strings and a 23" scale, renamed the ETG-150 in 1940) and a plectrum version (the EPG-150, with a 27" scale). The ETG-150, was in continuous production until 1972.

In the mid-1950s electric solid-body tenor guitar models began to appear from companies such as Gibson, Gretsch, Guild, and Epiphone. These were mostly produced as one-off custom instruments but, for a short time in 1955, Gretsch manufactured an electric solid-bodied tenor guitar, the Gretsch 6127 DuoJet. Renewed interest in the tenor guitar led to the introduction of new solid-body electric models in the early 21st century, with companies such as Fender beginning production of a tenor version of their Telecaster model.

Tuning 
Tenor guitars are normally tuned in fifths, usually
C−G−D−A,
similar to the tenor banjo, mandola, or viola. Other tunings are also common, such as
Chicago tuning
D−G−B−E
same as the top four strings of a standard guitar or a baritone ukulele
Irish bouzouki tunings
G−D−A−D
A−D−A−D
Octave mandolin or Irish banjo tuning
G−D−A−E
like an octave mandolin or tenor violin, one octave below the usual violin and mandolin tuning along with various "open" tunings for “slide” playing.

The tenor guitar can also be tuned in parallel octaves to a soprano, concert, or tenor ukulele, using various versions of G−C−E−A tuning.

Plectrum guitar 

Plectrum guitars have not been made in as large numbers as tenor guitars and are rarer. One of the best known plectrum guitarists from the Jazz Age was Eddie Condon, who started out on banjo in the 1920s and then switched to a Gibson L7 plectrum guitar in the 1930s.

Use and performers 

Tenor guitars are now very closely associated with the tenor banjo with its similar standard CGDA fifths tuning and they initially came to significant commercial prominence in the late 1920s and early 1930s as tenor banjos were slowly being replaced by six-string guitars in jazz bands and dance orchestras. Tenor banjo players could double on tenor guitars to get a guitar sound without having to learn the six-string guitar. This is a practice still carried out by many contemporary jazz banjo players. This period is generally regarded as the initial "golden age" of the tenor guitar.

Two of the McKendrick brothers, confusingly both named Mike – "Big" Mike and "Little" Mike – doubled on tenor banjo and tenor guitar in jazz bands dating from the 1920s. According to Bob Brozman in his book on National instruments, The History and Artistry of National Instruments, they both played National tenor guitars and they are both shown in the book in photos with their National tenor guitars. "Big" Mike McKendrick both managed and played with Louis Armstrong bands while "Little" Mike McKendrick played with various bands, including Tony Parenti.

Brozman's book also features photos of Hawaiian music bands that include players with both National tenor and plectrum guitars. The Delmore Brothers were a very influential pioneering country music duo from the early 1930s to the late 1940s that featured the tenor guitar. The Delmore Brothers were one of the original country vocal harmonising sibling acts that established the mold for later similar acts, such as the Louvin Brothers, and even later, the Everly Brothers.

The younger of the Delmore brothers, Rabon, played the tenor guitar as an accompaniment to his older brother, Alton's, six-string guitar. Rabon favoured the Martin 0-18T tenor guitar and the Louvin Brothers later recorded a tribute album to the Delmores that featured Rabon's Martin 0-18T tenor played by mandolinist Ira Louvin, but tuned as the four treble guitar strings. Another 1930s band that featured the tenor guitar was the Hoosier Hotshots, commonly considered the creators of mid-western rural jazz. Their leader, Ken Trietsch, played the tenor guitar, as well as doubling on the tuba.

In British Columbia, Canada, Professor Douglas Fraser plays thirties jazz with "The Genuine Jug Band" on a 1939 Gibson arch top tenor guitar. A musical style called Texas fiddling uses the tenor guitar as part of its rhythm accompaniment. Well known exponents of the tenor guitar in Texas fiddle music include Jerry Thomassen, Al Mouledous, and Gary Lee Moore. Thomassen has a signature tenor guitar named after him that is built by luthier Steve Parks. Gary Lee Moore has produced an excellent teaching resource for playing the tenor guitar as backup for Texas fiddling, entitled Getting Started in Fiddle Backup, obtainable as a free pdf download on the Tenor Guitar Registry discussion board web site.

In the early 1930s Selmer Guitars in Paris manufactured four-string guitars based on guitar designs by the Italian luthier Mario Maccaferri that they marketed to banjo players as a second six-string guitar-like instrument. The two main four-string Selmer models included a regular tenor guitar with a smaller body and a 23 inch scale length, tuned CGDA, and the Eddie Freeman Special, with a larger body and a longer scale length, using a reentrant CGDA tuning. The Eddie Freeman Special had been designed by English tenor banjoist Eddie Freeman to have a better six-string guitar sonority for rhythm guitar work than the normal tenor guitar with its very high A string. However, it was still tuned CGDA so that it could still be played by tenor banjoists. The Eddie Freeman Special was based on a six-string model and it had a larger six-string body and a six-string scale length of 25.25 inches, rather than the tenor's smaller body and normal 23 inch scale length. The CGDA tuning used was re-entrant with the C and D tuned in the same octave and the G and the A tuned in the same octave, lowering the overall tone. The tuning and scale length give this very unusual four-string guitar a sonority that is very close to that of the six-string guitar, compared to a regular tenor guitar.

Selmer heavily promoted the EFS guitar through the Melody Maker and Eddie Freeman even wrote a special tune for it called 'In All Sincerity'. There are also promotional photos of the well-known British singer, banjoist and guitarist Al Bowlly, playing the Eddie Freeman Special and it can be seen in use by Ray Noble's guitarist in a recording session photo of his orchestra. This guitar was not commercially successful in the 1930s, possibly due to concerted resistance by the British six-string guitar fraternity, particularly Ivor Mairants. Many were subsequently converted to much more valuable six-string models because of the Django Reinhardt connection. Originals of the Eddie Freeman Special are now very rare and are consequently highly valuable. Within the last three years, modern Maccaferri-style luthiers, such as the late David Hodson in the UK and Shelley Park in Canada, as well as others, have started building this four-string model again due to demand from their customers. Many have now been made and they are becoming more widely played. They are considered to have a beautiful sound and offer a very broad range of tuning possibilities including CGDA, GDAE, DGBE, CGBD, DGBD, and ADGB.

As the six-string guitar eventually became more popular in bands in the 1930s and 1940s, tenor guitars became much less played, although some tenor guitar models had been made in very large numbers throughout this period and are now still common. Tenor guitars came to prominence again in the 1950s and 1960s, possibly due to the effects of the Dixieland jazz revival and the folk music boom. At this time, they were made by makers such as Epiphone, Gibson, Guild and Gretsch as archtop acoustics and/or electrics, as well as a range of flat top models by Martin. Around this time in the 1950s and 1960s, electric tenor guitars were also referred to as "lead guitars", although the rationale for this is not now clear, unless it was for marketing purposes. Lead playing on a six-string guitar often involves just using its top four strings.

A major player of the electric tenor as a lead guitarist in the bebop and rhythm and blues styles from the 1940s to the 1970s was the jazz guitarist Tiny Grimes, who recorded with Cats and The Fiddle, Charlie Parker, Art Tatum and others. Tiny used guitar (DGBE) tuning on his tenor guitars, rather than tenor CGDA tuning.

The Martin 0-18T flat top acoustic tenor guitar was played in the late 1950s by Nick Reynolds of The Kingston Trio. The acoustic tenor guitar became a popular instrument in the folk music boom of this period, particularly this model. In 1997, as a tribute to the Kingston Trio, Martin re-issued 34 limited edition 40th anniversary commemorative sets (40 sets had been planned, but only 34 orders were received and executed) of the three main instruments used by the Kingston Trio to celebrate their founding in 1957. The commemorative set included a custom Martin Kingston Trio KT-18T tenor guitar with "The Kingston Trio" and "1957–1997" engraved on the fingerboard in mother-of-pearl and its label was signed by C.F. Martin IV, the CEO of Martin Guitars and four of the surviving members of the Kingston Trio.

Current use

Since 2001, there has been an increased interest in the tenor guitar, as evidenced by an increasing number of manufacturers, such as Eastwood Guitars, Blueridge, Gold Tone, Artist Guitars, Canora, Thomann, Harley Benton and Ibanez, offering tenor guitar models, and a greater number of specialist luthiers now building custom tenor guitar models or offering to modify existing instruments into tenor guitars.  Kala recently introduced a 21.5″ scale acoustic tenor guitar, the KA-GTR.

Contemporary players of the tenor guitar include Neko Case, Josh Rouse, Joel Plaskett, Adam Gnade, Ani DiFranco, Carrie Rodriguez, Joe Craven, and Dhani Harrison. Jason Molina played a tenor guitar for much of his early work as Songs: Ohia. The instrument is often used by musicians looking to replace or augment sounds produced by more conventional instruments. Elvis Costello features a tenor guitar on the title track of his 2004 release Delivery Man. On the video for "Club Date: Elvis Costello & the Imposters Live in Memphis" he is seen playing an orange 1958 Gretsch Chet Atkins 6120 single cutaway archtop tenor guitar.

Tenor guitars can be difficult to locate outside the United States since from the late 1920s when they were first produced, they were mostly manufactured in the United States. Up until relatively recently they were usually regarded as musical oddities with little value but now they are becoming very attractive to both players and collectors, particularly the National resonator instruments.

Production tenor guitars by Gibson and Martin from the 1940s to the 1960s are still generally available, such as Gibson's ETG-150 electric/acoustic archtop tenor guitar and Martin's 0-18T acoustic flat top tenor guitar. Original tenor guitars in good condition by any of the major guitar makers are considered very desirable, either as instruments for playing, or as interesting collectibles in their own right.  Some specially ordered custom tenor guitar models from makers, such as Gibson, can be extremely rare since only one of the particular model may only have been manufactured. As noted above, in the pre-World War  II period, Gibson offered either the tenor or plectrum guitar version of any model they made at no extra cost to the purchaser.

There has been an increase in the number of artists who feature the tenor guitar in their music. Prominent U.K. users of the tenor guitar include the Lakeman brothers, Seth Lakeman and Sean Lakeman, and John McCusker and Ian Carr, who both play with the Kate Rusby Band. Irish folk artist Yawning Chasm primarily uses the tenor guitar.

Terry Bohner, a character in the mockumentary film A Mighty Wind about the U.S. folk music era of the 1950s and 1960s, uses a tenor guitar.

Wes Borland, the guitarist for nu metal band Limp Bizkit plays a low-tuned (F−F−B−E) four-string guitar on the songs "Nookie", "The One", "Full Nelson", and "Stalemate". For the longest time, he used a 4-string "Cremona" tenor guitar made by Master guitars. In April 2022, he commissioned PRS Guitars to make a custom four-string guitar.

Since 2010, Astoria, Oregon, has hosted an annual Tenor Guitar Gathering, on the basis of which some call it the "unofficial Tenor Guitar Capital of the World."

Warren Ellis plays a tenor guitar on the Nick Cave and the Bad Seeds album Push the Sky Away, and has custom tenor guitars built by Eastwood Guitars, with a shape modeled after a Fender Mustang but with a wider than usual neck to accommodate his fingerstyle playing. Eastwood currently offers several models of electric tenor guitar including the aforementioned Warren Ellis signature model, the semi-hollow Classic 4 Tenor, and the Tenorcaster.

See also
 Alto guitar
 Cavaquinho

References

Bibliography 

  — An Identification Guide for American Fretted Instruments.

  — A comprehensive chord dictionary instructional guide featuring both standard and Irish tuning.

  Tenor Guitar Chord Genius books in most tunings

Guitar family instruments